Erich Welter (30 June 1900, Strasbourg - 10 June 1982, Frankfurt) was a German economist and the founding editor of the Frankfurter Allgemeine Zeitung from November 1949.

Welter was a professor of economics at the University of Mainz between 1946 and 1973.

Awards 

 1975 Large Federal Cross of Merit with a star
 1978 Ludwig Erhard Medal for services to the social market economy
 1981 plaque of honor from the city of Frankfurt am Main

References 

1900 births
1982 deaths
German newspaper editors
German economists
Frankfurter Allgemeine Zeitung people
Academic staff of Johannes Gutenberg University Mainz
Knights Commander of the Order of Merit of the Federal Republic of Germany
Member of the Mont Pelerin Society